Jean-César Vincens-Plauchut (September 16, 1755 – August 15, 1801) is a French politician. Vincens-Plauchut has been an MP for Gard.

References

External links 
 Biographical details on the National Assembly's site

1755 births
1801 deaths
People from Nîmes
Politicians from Occitania (administrative region)
Members of the Legislative Assembly (France)